Boris Vulfovich Sohn (10 [25] January 1898, Syzran — 10 June 1966, Leningrad) was a Soviet stage actor, theatre director and theatre educator. He was made an Honored Artist of the RSFSR in 1934.

References

External links
http://seance.ru/blog/zon-school/
https://web.archive.org/web/20120605023048/http://seance.ru/blog/shkola-borisa-zona
http://www.5-tv.ru/video/501775/

1898 births
1966 deaths
20th-century Russian male actors
People from Syzran
Honored Artists of the RSFSR
Recipients of the Order of the Red Banner of Labour
Performing arts education in Russia
Jewish Russian actors
Russian drama teachers
Russian male stage actors
Russian theatre directors
Soviet drama teachers
Soviet Jews
Soviet male stage actors
Soviet theatre directors